Phyllobates is a genus of poison dart frogs native to Central and South America, from Nicaragua to Colombia. There are 3 different Colombian species of Phyllobates, considered highly toxic species due to the poison they contain in the wild.

Phyllobates contains the most poisonous species of frog, the golden poison frog (P. terribilis). They are typical of the poison dart frogs, in that all species have bright warning coloration (aposematism), and have varying degrees of toxicity. Only species of Phyllobates are used by natives of South American tribes as sources of poison for their hunting darts. The most toxic of the many poisonous alkaloids these frogs contain (in glands in their skin) is batrachotoxin, alongside a wide variety of other toxic compounds. Some populations of Phyllobates lugubris in Central America are not known to be toxic.

Taxonomy 
Phyllobates (Ancient Greek for "leaf climber") used to contain many of the species which are now within the genus Ranitomeya. However, it now just contains those six members within the Phyllobates bicolor species group. These are:

All these different species within the genus exhibit a diversity in color. Some examples are, P. terribilis, with color morphs of "mint", "yellow", and "orange". P. vittatus, another example, is always black as a ground color, but can show yellow stripes, orange stripes, red stripes,(stripes of all colors can be seen in two forms, narrow- and wide-banded) and turquoise, green, or blue legs, etc. The bicolor dart frog (Phyllobates bicolor) can range from yellow to orange, from black legs to green legs, to almost a uniform color of any of the aforementioned color morphs. P. aurotaenia specimens are yellow-banded or orange. They are always smaller than P. vittatus, and beyond locality, this is the best way to differentiate between the two in the field or in the hobby.

Source of toxin
The toxic alkaloid batrachotoxin is only present in frogs found in the wild; after extended captivity, they lose their toxin, indicating that they acquire it (or metabolize it) from their natural diet; this alkaloid has been found in Papuan beetle species in the family Melyridae, and other related genera can be found in Colombia and other areas where Phyllobates are found.

See also 
Allopumiliotoxin 267A
Pumiliotoxin 251D

References 

 
Amphibian genera
Taxa named by André Marie Constant Duméril
Taxa named by Gabriel Bibron

Amphibians of South America
Amphibians of Central America